Bord Khun-e Kohneh (also Romanized as Bord Khūn-e Kohneh; also known as Bord Khūng-e Kohneh and Kahneh) is a village in Bord Khun Rural District of Bord Khun District, Deyr County, Bushehr province, Iran. At the 2006 census, its population was 579 in 119 households. The following census in 2011 counted 644 people in 155 households. The latest census in 2016 showed a population of 826 people in 213 households; it was the largest village in its rural district.

References 

Populated places in Deyr County